The short gastric arteries are of 5-7 small branches of the splenic artery that pass along part of the greater curvature of the stomach from left to right between the layers of the gastrolienal ligament, and are distributed to the greater curvature of the stomach.

Structure

Origin 
The short gastric arteries arise from the end of the splenic artery and its terminal divisions.

Distribution 
The short gastric arteries supply the fundus of the stomach on the side of the greater curvature of the stomach.

Anastomoses 
The short gastric arteries form anastomoses with branches of the left gastric artery, and left gastro-omental artery.

Unlike the gastroepiploics and the left and right gastric arteries, the short gastric arteries have poor anastomoses if the splenic artery is blocked.

References

External links
 

Arteries of the abdomen
Stomach